Space Football: One on One, known in Japan as , is a video game developed by Bits Studios and released in 1992 exclusively for the Super Nintendo Entertainment System. The game takes place in the future with two athletes attempting to score goals against each other.

Gameplay

Using retro grav hovercraft, these two athletes must gain possession of a hovering ball. There are twelve different drivers to choose from. 32 levels offer different obstacles and level design for players to skilfully move the ball around.

Features included mode 7 scrolling. The player moves the ball up the field by shooting it. Obstacles are thrown in the player's way to block progress. This is to replace the lack of defenders used in an American football game played in the real world. These obstacles include magnetic flux fields that drains the player's energy and spincycles that twist the player out of control. Every background has a science fiction look to it with the stars and the space colony being shown. The goal scoring areas are similar to soccer nets but without the goalkeeper blocking it.

There is a timer announcing the number of time units left in the game. The player is not allowed to hold the ball after four seconds.

References

1992 video games
Acclaim Entertainment games
American football video games
Science fiction video games
Super Nintendo Entertainment System games
Super Nintendo Entertainment System-only games
Video games developed in the United Kingdom
Multiplayer and single-player video games
Argonaut Games games
Bits Studios games